This is a list of Lesotho Twenty20 International cricketers.

In April 2018, the ICC decided to grant full Twenty20 International (T20I) status to all its members. Therefore, all Twenty20 matches played between Lesotho and other ICC members after 1 January 2019 will be eligible for T20I status. Lesotho played their first T20I against Eswatini on 16 October 2021 during the 2021 ICC Men's T20 World Cup Africa Qualifier.

This list comprises all members of the Lesotho cricket team who have played at least one T20I match. It is initially arranged in the order in which each player won his first Twenty20 cap. Where more than one player won his first Twenty20 cap in the same match, those players are listed alphabetically by surname.

Key

List of players
Statistics are correct as of 25 November 2022.

References 

Lesotho